is a Japanese web manga series written and illustrated by Arata Kawabata. It was serialized on Shogakukan's website Yawaraka Spirits from October 2018 to October 2019, with its chapters collected in two tankōbon volumes.

Publication
Written and illustrated by Arata Kawabata, Do You Like the Nerdy Nurse? was serialized on Shogakukan's website Yawaraka Spirits from October 3, 2018, to October 4, 2019. Shogakukan collected its chapters in two tankōbon volumes, released on May 10 and November 12, 2019.

In North America, the manga was licensed for English release by Yen Press and released in a single volume on March 2, 2021.

Volume list

See also
Shingun no Cadet, another manga series by the same author

References

External links
 

Romantic comedy anime and manga
Seinen manga
Shogakukan manga
Webcomics in print
Yen Press titles